Richard Harland (born 15 January 1947 in Yorkshire) is an English fantasy and science fiction writer, living in New South Wales, Australia. He was born in 1947 in Huddersfield, United Kingdom and migrated to Australia in 1970. He has been an academic, performance artist and writer, publishing 15 full-length works of fiction, three academic books, short stories and poems.

He is the author of the Eddon and Vail science fiction thriller series, the Heaven and Earth young adult fantasy trilogy and the illustrated Wolf Kingdom series for children. He has been awarded the Australian Aurealis Award on five occasions for his fiction.

Life and academic career
Richard Harland completed undergraduate studies at Cambridge University, graduating with a BA and majoring in English. After graduation, he planned an ambitious doctoral thesis, focusing on a global theory of the language of poetry and approached numerous universities around the globe seeking funding for his research. Support was unforthcoming until an offer from the University of Newcastle in New South Wales, consequently he migrated to Australia in 1970 to take advantage of this opportunity. He originally only intended to remain in the country until his PhD was completed, but after some months decided to settle permanently.

Work on his thesis was slow, and he eventually reduced its scope to an MA, before moving away from his studies for several years, while he worked as a singer, songwriter and poet in and around Sydney. He published poetry and short stories during this period in a number of literary magazines. He returned to academic life in the 1980s through a tutoring position at the University of New South Wales and continued work on his doctoral thesis, which was published as Superstructuralism: The Philosophy of Structuralism and Post-Structuralism in 1987. The volume sold well, was well received, and secured him a lecturing position in English at the University of Wollongong, where he remained for ten years. During his academic career he published full-length works and a number of articles on literary theory.

Fiction writing
He scored an early success in childhood with a short story which won a prominent United Kingdom competition, and also wrote and distributed stories while at school, exchanging ongoing instalments for sweets and other tokens when other pupils were reluctant to part with legal tender.

He is best known for several series of novels, but commenced his novel writing career relatively late in life. He had been eager to write full length tales from late childhood but suffered from writer's block, which prevented him making significant headway with novel projects (and also many short stories) for much of the next 25 years. He was able to produce academic books during this period, however, and he attributes the writer's block partly to his belief that he had to write serious literary novels rather than what he found most enjoyable to work on. It was not until writing the comic horror novel The Vicar of Morbing Vyle (1993) that he managed to conquer this obstacle. However he had published short stories prior to this, some of which were collected in Testimony (1981), which also included his poetry.

He was still lecturing at the University of Wollongong when he wrote The Dark Edge, the first novel of his "Eddon and Vail" science fiction thriller series. His senior lecturing role was a secure tenured position, much sought after by professional scholars, however, with a sequel to The Dark Edge having been commissioned by his publisher, Pan Macmillan Australia, set to appear the following year, he felt unable to juggle the demands of full-time academic life with fiction writing. Despite an uncertain future in a small Australian publication market, where relatively low volume sales are considered a best-seller and there are few full-time writers, he resigned his position in 1997 to concentrate on his fiction. He has been a full-time writer ever since. He remains an Honorary Senior Fellow in English at the University of Wollongong. He has also taught summer courses at the university, most recently on children's and young adult fantasy literature.

Novels
Many of Harland's novels contain maps. He has confessed to a fascination with maps, sometimes spending hours studying them. He has also admitted to often viewing his fictional worlds as though seen from an elevated distance, something he feels is a common feature among fantasy writers.

Following the 1999 publication of Hidden from View, the final volume in his Eddon and Vail series, all of his novels have been written either for young adults or children, with the exception of The Black Crusade (2004). Some of his novels have also been published as audio books.

The "Vicar" series
The first volume of this series, The Vicar of Morbing Vyle, was Harland's first published novel. He set up his own publishing company to bring it to press, and approached individual booksellers in the Australian cities of Brisbane, Canberra, Melbourne and Sydney to promote it. While it is no longer in print, it has since attained a cult status, something he claims was his original intention when marketing the book.

It was followed in 2004 by The Black Crusade, a prequel to The Vicar of Morbing Vyle. It describes the journey of the hapless Basil Smorta, a multi lingual bank clerk, who is forced into the company of a group of "fundamental Darwinists" by their imprisonment of the object of his undying love, Australian singer, Volusia, in a mobile iron box. The group travel across Eastern Europe during 1894, and encounter ghosts, blood donating vampires and other comic horror curiosities. The novel, which shows the origin of the 'vyle' Marquis of Morbol Villica from the first volume in the series, plays with the notion of the tale's reliability as a factual narrative, including fictional footnotes, apparently inserted by the publisher, to show their disdain and disagreement with Basil's actions and their unheroic qualities.

The novel was published by Chimaera Publications, which also produces Aurealis, a magazine which publishes and promotes Australian speculative fiction, and originated the Aurealis Awards (although these awards have been administered entirely independently from Chimaera by another organisation since 2004). The novel won an Aurealis Award in 2004 in both the "Best Horror Novel" and the overarching "Golden Aurealis Best Novel" categories.

The Eddon and Vail series
In this series of three science fiction novels with both mystery and supernatural elements, Inspector Eddon Brac, a male detective with traditional sleuth leanings, is partnered with assistant Vail ev Vessintor, a female goth noble with expertise in the psychic sciences. Each novel presents the pair with a murder mystery with an unorthodox and surprising origin and also explores the tension between them.

The series is set against the background of the colonial hegemony of the planet Terra, whose influence has spread across the cosmos, but is increasingly threatened by the Anti-Human, an unknown menace, which follows a steady path from the boundaries of the universe towards the core, consuming Terran colonies as it advances.
 
The first volume, The Dark Edge was a finalist for the 1997 Aurealis Award in both the Horror Novel and Science Fiction Novel categories and the third, Hidden from View, was nominated for the 1999 Ditmar Award in the Best Novel category.

The Heaven and Earth trilogy
This trilogy for young adults is set in Australia 1000 years into the future and concerns a war between heaven and earth. Each book includes an 'angelology'.

In preparation for writing the trilogy, Harland extensively researched angels and cosmology, including both the mainstream and unorthodox sources of Christian, Islamic and Judaic lore on the subjects. He was particularly concerned to present angels as beings which departed from the comforting 'Disney' representations of some previous works, and were awe inspiring, beautiful and disturbing, while remaining characters readers could still empathise with. The first book he read on angels was A Dictionary of Angels by American poet Gustav Davidson, and he has returned to this book numerous times since to help with inspiration on subsequent fiction projects. He has also stated that the Ghent Altarpiece by Jan van Eyck greatly assisted in creating his vision of heaven.

The Wolf Kingdom series

The Wolf Kingdom Series comprises four illustrated fantasy books, aimed at older pre-adolescents, commencing with Escape! and completed by The Heavy Crown, all published in 2008. Harland wrote the story, and Laura Peterson provided illustrations which head each chapter and are mostly full page. Each tale functions as a self-contained narrative, but the series also interlinks as a larger story arc.

The books were launched in association with the Children's Book Council of Australia.

A race of talking, bipedal wolves have overrun and enslaved humankind, leaving only a determined resistance, known as the "Free Folk", who shelter in a subterranean refuge and plot to liberate themselves from their animal overlords and must discover how these creatures have risen from their former bestial state, to become oppressive rulers of humankind. The books focus on two children, a brother and sister, whose parents are taken by the wolves, and who subsequently join the "Free Folk" and become key to the success of the rebellion. Harland has long been fascinated with wolves; during his childhood in the United Kingdom he passed an ominous wood named 'Wolves Wood' on daily basis in a school bus and this left a marked impression upon him.

The series won the 2008 Aurealis Award for the "best children's illustrated work/picture book" category. In awarding the series an Aurealis the judges, acknowledging the dual work of Harland and his illustrator partner, Laura Peterson, commented: "The illustrations help to bring alive aspects of the story – muscular pictures for a muscular tale. Laura Peterson has shown attention to detail in all the artwork pertaining to the wolves and helps to support the atmosphere of peril that Richard Harland has created."

Worldshaker
Harland's most recent series of novels commenced with Worldshaker, a young adult steampunk novel partly inspired by the work of Charles Dickens, released in May 2009 in Australia. The main inspiration for this book was the dream he had which is now one of the scenes in the book. The principal character is Col, who lives in the privileged upper sections of a mountain-sized city-ship. He has been selected to become the next commander of the craft, but is forced to question his world when a girl who has escaped from the lower decks, seeks his help and reveals to him the poverty and exploitation below the elite world of his upbringing. The novel sold to US publisher Simon & Schuster for a substantial advance.

The story itself is very similar to the plot of the film Metropolis. Both feature a young man who is the heir to a futuristic society where the wealthy live "above" and the poorly treated workers "below", with a young woman of the worker class teaming together with the young man to overthrow the cruel establishment.

Harland began developing the ideas for Worldshaker in the mid 1990s and took five years to write the novel, passing through 3 complete rewrites. It was first entitled Leviathan, later Juggernaught before finally being published as Worldshaker. The sequel to Worldshaker has been published as Liberator.

Other young adult fiction novels
Walter Wants to Be a Werewolf (2003)
It is part of the Aussie Chomps series for teenagers. Walter is a young member of a family of werewolves, but struggles to manifest true werewolf characteristics when the full moon rises, and subsequently visits a doctor hoping to find a cure for his condition.

Sassycat: The Night of the Dead (2005)
It was a finalist for the 2005 Aurealis Award for best children's (8–12 years) long fiction.

Shorter works of fiction
Richard Harland has published nearly 20 short stories and novellas.  His work has been included in anthologies such as Encounters, Outcast, and the 2008 published Dreaming Again, the second anthology of Australian speculative fiction compiled by prolific editor and anthologist, Jack Dann. He has also published shorter works in magazines in Australia and the United States. Several of his stories have received honourable mentions in the prominent Year's Best Fantasy and Horror anthologies, edited by Ellen Datlow & Terri Windling. His shorter fiction has been both nominated for and won Australian speculative fiction awards.

Author's website
His website is notable for presenting the substance and background of each of his fiction projects, and dozens of pages of writing tips. It also includes an extended biography, describing the development of his writing career, including his protracted battle with writer's block.

Harland has a second website created solely to provide advice to writers. The result of a four-month break from his writing it has over 140 pages of advice and tips and is located at http://www.writingtips.com.au.

Awards
Richard Harland has won the following awards:

The Black Crusade 
2004 Aurealis Award for Best Horror Novel
2004 Golden Aurealis for Best Novel

"Catabolic Magic" 
2004 Aurealis Award for Best Fantasy Short Story (tie with Louise Katz)

"The Greater Death of Saito Saku" 
2005 Aurealis Award for Best Fantasy Short Story (tie with Rosaleen Love)

'The Wolf Kingdom series' (Escape!, Under Siege, Race to the Ruins, The Heavy Crown) 
2008 Aurealis Award for Best Children's Illustrated Work/Picture Book (with Laura Peterson as Illustrator)

He was guest judge on the 2007 Australian Shadows award.

References

External links
 
 Richard Harland Writing Tips Website
 
 

1947 births
Living people
20th-century Australian novelists
21st-century Australian novelists
Australian male novelists
Australian science fiction writers
People from Huddersfield
Australian fantasy writers
Australian children's writers
Australian horror writers
Australian male short story writers
Academic staff of the University of Wollongong
20th-century Australian short story writers
21st-century Australian short story writers
20th-century Australian male writers
21st-century Australian male writers